Nicolò Zanon (born 27 March 1961) is an Italian judge and law professor. He has been Judge of the Constitutional Court of Italy since 11 November 2014. Previously he was a law professor at the University of Milan.

Career
Zanon was born in Turin. He was a professor of Constitutional law at the University of Milan before being appointed to the Constitutional Court by the Italian President, Giorgio Napolitano, on 18 October 2014. Zanon had also worked at the University of Turin as a comparative constitutional law researcher and as an assistant to Valerio Onida, a judge on the Constitutional Court of Italy. Zanon was sworn in on 11 November 2014.

Zanon was made Knight Grand Cross in the Order of Merit of the Italian Republic on 31 May 2017.

References

1961 births
Living people
Judges of the Constitutional Court of Italy
Jurists from Turin
Knights Grand Cross of the Order of Merit of the Italian Republic
Academic staff of the University of Turin
Academic staff of the University of Milan